Ma'an Hill station is a station on Line 11 of the Shenzhen Metro in China. It opened on 28 June 2016.

Station layout

Exits

References

External links
 Shenzhen Metro Ma'an Hill Station (Chinese)
 Shenzhen Metro Ma'an Hill Station (English)

Railway stations in Guangdong
Shenzhen Metro stations
Bao'an District
Railway stations in China opened in 2016